The OTs-12 Tiss is a Russian fully automatic compact assault rifle. It is chambered for the subsonic 9×39mm round.

The Tiss is meant to equip OMNO and SOBR units in CQB-based operations.

History
The rifle was developed in the early 1990s in TsKIB SOO of Tula designers VN Telesh and Yu.V.Lebedev. It is basically an AKS-74U re-chambered for 9×39mm, it was designed as alternative to the AKS-74U. The TsKIB COO of Tula made several hundred of OTs-12s, which were transferred to the Interior Ministry security forces. 

Despite the good evaluation, the Tula Arms Plant did not put the rifle into mass-production. They instead opted for a bullpup configuration known as OTs-14 Groza, which became its successor.

In 2018, a replica of the Tiss was reported to be designed by Daniel Fisher of KNS Precision.

Design
The main design changes from the AKS-74U are in the bolt, barrel, muzzle-brake, and magazine. Early versions were made with a long barrel.

The 20-round box magazine was designed so that it would be compatible with standard current-issue ammo pouches, but a larger 25-round magazine was in early production until its cancellation.

The subsonic round showed superior penetration of cover at short and medium ranges (200–300 m) when compared to the 5.45×39mm. 

Criticism was placed on the Tiss since a user cannot clean the gas outlet.

See also
 AK-9
 OTs-14 Groza
 SR-3 Vikhr
 9A-91

References

9×39mm firearms
Assault rifles of Russia
Kalashnikov derivatives
TsKIB SOO products
Military equipment introduced in the 1990s